Aaron M. Kaufman (born February 15, 1987) is an American politician and disability rights advocate. A member of the  Democratic Party, he is a member of the Maryland House of Delegates for District 18 in Montgomery County. Kaufman has cerebral palsy, and is the first member of the Maryland General Assembly with a physical disability.

Background
Kaufman graduated from Walter Johnson High School. He attended Montgomery College, where he received an associate degree in general studies in 2009, and the University of Maryland, College Park, where he received a Bachelor of Arts degree in American studies in 2011.

Kaufman previously served as an administrative assistant for the Maryland House Ways and Means Committee. He is a long-time member of the Maryland Developmental Disabilities Council and RespectAbility, and has worked on campaigns at several levels of government. He also served as a senior manager of legislative affairs at the Jewish Federations of North America.

In 2014, Kaufman was elected to the Montgomery County Central Committee and served through December 2022.

On April 19, 2022, Kaufman applied to run for the Maryland House of Delegates in District 18, seeking to replace state Delegate Al Carr on the ballot after Carr withdrew his candidacy hours before the candidate filing deadline on April 15 to run for the county council, and no candidates were able to file to run in his place before the deadline. On April 20, the Montgomery County Democratic Central Committee voted to nominate him to run in the district. Kaufman, along with state Delegates Emily Shetty and Jared Solomon, faced Republican George Cecala in the general election.

In the legislature
Kaufman was sworn into the Maryland House of Delegates on January 11, 2023. He is a member of the House Judiciary Committee.

Political positions

Climate change
In May 2022, Kaufman signed a Chesapeake Climate Action Network pledge to support legislation to get Maryland to use 100 percent carbon-free electricity by 2035 and to remove trash incineration from the state's "clean energy" classification.

Disability rights
While working at the Jewish Federations of North America, Kaufman pushed for legislation that would offer more financial security to people with disabilities, including the ABLE Age Adjustment Act (S.331) and the Savings Penalty Elimination Act (S.4102). In July 2011, Kaufman attended a Barack Obama rally at the University of Maryland, College Park to urge the president to protect disability funding in budgetary negotiations with Congress.

Taxes
In February 2011, Kaufman joined more than 100 disabilities advocates in a rally at the Maryland State House calling on the legislature to raise the state's alcohol tax. The alcohol tax bill was signed into law by Governor Martin O'Malley on May 19, 2011.

In April 2022, Kaufman said he supported creating combined reporting for corporate taxes.

Voting rights
In April 2022, Kaufman said he supported establishing other mechanisms of filling vacancies in the Maryland General Assembly, such as special elections. Currently, under Maryland law, the only way to fill such a vacancy is through nomination by local central committees.

Electoral history

References

External links
 

1987 births
21st-century American politicians
American politicians with disabilities
Democratic Party members of the Maryland House of Delegates
Living people
Montgomery College alumni
People with cerebral palsy
People from Chevy Chase, Maryland
University of Maryland, College Park alumni